Muchlarnick (meaning great woodland clearing) is a hamlet in Cornwall, England. It is about two miles east of Lanreath in the civil parish of Pelynt.

See also

Trefanny Hill

References

Hamlets in Cornwall